Christian Rosha Hosoi (born October 5, 1967) is an American professional skateboarder. He is also known by the nicknames "Christ" and "Holmes".

Early life
Hosoi was born on October 5, 1967 to a father of Japanese descent from Hawaii, and a mother of European and American descent. He grew up in Los Angeles and Hawaii.

Skateboard career
Hosoi started skating at seven or eight years old with veterans such as Shogo Kubo, Tony Alva, Stacy Peralta, and Jay Adams as his idols. His father, Ivan "Pops" Hosoi became the manager of the Marina Del Rey Skatepark, and Christian quit school and spent his time there where he developed his skill. 

In 1979, as an amateur, Hosoi was sponsored by Powell Peralta. He left Powell Peralta a year later when they would not allow him to turn professional and joined Dogtown Skateboards. Shortly thereafter, Dogtown went out of business. Christian turned pro at the age of 14 with Sims Skateboards. After leaving Sims, Hosoi joined Alva Skates with the idea of launching his own company through Alva. Hosoi later claimed that he "almost quit" Alva Skates following an argument over Hosoi's allegation that Alva "cheated [Hosoi] out" of the fish-tail board shape, which Hosoi claimed to have conceptualized and shown to Alva. 

Hosoi invented the Christ Air and Rocket Air. In 1984, he formed his own company, Hosoi Skates, first distributed through Skull Skates, then through NHS-INC.

When street skating began to emerge in the mid-to-late 1980s, Hosoi showed talent there, winning both the vert and street contests at the Lotte Cup contest in Japan in 1989.

Incarceration

Hosoi's pro career began to falter as a recession hit the US in the early 1990s and as street skating began to overtake vert in media coverage. Hosoi faced bankruptcy after financial difficulties with a series of failed skateboard companies like Tuff Sk8s, Sk8 Kultur, Milk, and Focus, in addition to a growing addiction to drugs.

In 1995, Hosoi was arrested on two minor offenses, and a warrant for his arrest was issued for failing to appear in court. To avoid arrest, Hosoi stopped attending competitions and demos, including declining an invitation to the first X Games (then the Extreme Games), which was going to be marketed as a renewed rivalry between Hawk and Hosoi.

Hosoi was finally captured in January 2000 at the Honolulu airport.
He was charged with trafficking with the intent to distribute. He was sentenced to ten years' incarceration, of which he served four and was released from the San Bernardino Central Detention Center in June 2004.

Personal life

Hosoi is married to former nightclub dancer Jennifer Lee and has four sons, James Hosoi, Rhythm Hosoi (from a previous relationship), Classic Hosoi and Endless Hosoi.

Christianity
Hosoi became a born-again Christian through the urging of his wife and her uncle, Pastor Christopher Swaim. He also earned his high school diploma.
Hosoi continues to be open about his new-found faith, having become ordained as an associate pastor, and has resumed his skateboarding career.

Hosoi was the subject of the 2006 documentary film, Rising Son, that detailed his initial success, drug addiction, and conversion to Christianity.

Hosoi joined forces with Jay Haizlip, Brian Sumner, and others to create The Uprising, a skate-based ministry. In 2008, The Uprising was documented by Steelroots, a Christian youth television network, and made into a reality television show. The first season comprised eight episodes and followed the ministry around California and England.

Hosoi also appeared in a testimonial video on I Am Second, in which he shares the story of his faith in Jesus.

Hosoi along with co-author Chris Ahrens released his autobiography book Hosoi: My Life as a Skateboarder Junkie Inmate Pastor in 2012 that chronicles his life story and testimony of finding redemption and purpose after reading the Bible and becoming a pastor.

Video game appearances
Hosoi is a playable character in the video games Tony Hawk's Project 8 as an unlockable and Tony Hawk: Ride.

References 

 Brooke, Michael (1999). Concrete Wave: The History Of Skateboarding. .
 Sports Illustrated (June 7, 2004). Skate and Destroy article by Karl Taro Greenfeld

External links

The Uprising The Uprising Reality Series on Steelroots.com
Rising Son – The Legend of Skateboarder Christian Hosoi on IMDB.com
iamsecond Christian Hosoi video testimony on iamsecond.com
Interview at Age 17 Board Images Skate Zine; Issue 5 (1984); Honolulu, HI / archive.org

1967 births
American evangelicals
American people convicted of drug offenses
American people of Japanese descent
American skateboarders
American sportspeople convicted of crimes
Place of birth missing (living people)
Living people
American sportspeople of Japanese descent